Bereyli (also Romanized as Bereylī) is a village in Pain Velayat Rural District, Razaviyeh District, Mashhad County, Razavi Khorasan Province, Iran. At the 2006 census, its population was 75, in 21 families.

References 

Populated places in Mashhad County